Edward Ernest H. Bruneteau (August 1, 1919 — July 30, 2002) was a Canadian ice hockey right winger. Bruneteau played 181 games with the Detroit Red Wings of the National Hockey League over seven seasons between 1941 and 1948. He also coached the Omaha Lancers of the United States Hockey League for 21 games in the 1986–87 season leading the team to a 0–21 record. Ed is the younger brother of "Mud" Bruneteau, famous for ending the longest overtime game in NHL history.

Professional career

Minor league hockey
Brunetau was born in St. Boniface, Manitoba. He played junior hockey with the Winnipeg Rangers of the MJHL and the Duluth Zephyrs of the TBSHL. He showed promise as a scorer and his rights were traded to the Detroit Red Wings on October 2, 1939 for cash. Detroit allowed Bruneteau to remain in the minors, as a member of the American Hockey Association's Omaha Knights, who were formed after the Zephyrs home rink roof collapsed during a heavy snowstorm in the winter of 1939. He went on to score 28 points in 37 games that season and along with chipping in two goals during a short playoff run.

Playing for the Red Wings
The following season saw Bruneteau starting again with the Knights, being transferred for a short time to the Indianapolis Capitals of the American Hockey League, and then heading into the big leagues by starting in 11 games for the Red Wings. He rejoined his older brother, Mud, who had joined the team the preceding season. Bruneteau finished the season with a goal and an assist and played in Detroit's first three playoff games before being let go.

Back in the minors
Bruneteau was signed as a free agent by the Quebec Aces of the Quebec Senior Hockey League on November 13, 1941 and began play on the top line for the 1941–42 season. He scored 28 points in the 38 games of the regular season and the Allan Cup championship. Bruneteau also scored four goals and an assist in the Aces' playoff run. The following season, Bruneteau worked on increasing his speed and it showed. Bruneteau ended the 1942–43 season with 37 points in the 31-game regular season and 23 points in the 9-game Allan Cup Championship. In 1943–44, He scored 41 points in just 25 games and helped the Aces win the Allan Cup by adding another 26 points in their 15 playoff games.

Playing for the Red Wings, take two
Bruneteau had made himself valuable again and the Quebec Aces traded him back to the Detroit Red Wings for Bob Thorpe on November 16, 1944. This time Bruneteau made himself a staple on the big team and played three full seasons for Detroit. He often formed a solid line with Carl Liscombe and Murray Armstrong and ended with 77 points over a three-year span. After the 1946–47 season, Bruneteau began spending less time in Detroit a more time in the minors. In 1948–49, Bruneteau played his last NHL game, but remained a scoring threat playing for Indianapolis. He knocked in 38 points in 61 games before being moved to rejoin with the Omaha Knights, now of the USHL. He again was reunited with his older brother who was head coach of the Knights. Under his brother's leadership, Bruneteau would score 149 points for Omaha in the two following seasons, including leading the team in scoring in 1949–50 and being named to the USHL Second All-Star Team both years. For the 1951–52 season, Bruneteau would be back with the Indianapolis Capitals, scoring 41 points in 56 games. Detroit released Bruneteau after that season and he found his way to the Milwaukee Clarks of the International Hockey League where he again went on a scoring frenzy, putting up 51 points and being named to the IHL Second All-Star Team. Bruneteau felt he had one more good season in him and spent it playing with the Sherbrooke Saints of the Quebec Hockey League. After scoring 49 points that year, Bruneteau retired from playing ice hockey. He died in Omaha, Nebraska in 2002.

Career statistics

Regular season and playoffs

Awards and achievements
Allan Cup Championship (1944)
USHL Second All-Star Team (1950 & 1951)
USHL Championship (1951)
IHL Second All-Star Team (1953)
Honoured Member of the Manitoba Hockey Hall of Fame

References

External links
 
 Ed Bruneteau's  biography at Manitoba Hockey Hall of Fame
 

1919 births
2002 deaths
Canadian expatriates in the United States
Canadian ice hockey right wingers
Detroit Red Wings players
Franco-Manitoban people
Indianapolis Capitals players
Milwaukee Chiefs players
Omaha Knights (AHA) players
Omaha Knights (USHL) players
People from Saint Boniface, Winnipeg
Quebec Aces (QSHL) players
Sherbrooke Saints players
Ice hockey people from Winnipeg
Winnipeg Rangers players
20th-century Canadian people